Lithocarpus corneri is a tree in the beech family Fagaceae. It is named for the English botanist E. J. H. Corner.

Description
The brown bark is rough. The flowers are solitary on the rachis.

Distribution and habitat
Lithocarpus corneri is endemic to Borneo where it is known only from Sabah. Its habitat is hillside forests from 500 to 650 meters elevation. It grows in Gunong Lumaku Forest Reserve and Trusmadi Forest Reserve.

References

corneri
Endemic flora of Borneo
Trees of Borneo
Flora of Sabah
Plants described in 1998
Flora of the Borneo lowland rain forests